Johann Friedrich Zückert (19 December 1737 – 1 May 1778) was a German physician.

1737 births
1778 deaths
18th-century German physicians
Physicians from Berlin